Julio César Tobar (born June 30, 1978) is a Colombian footballer who plays defender for Millonarios.

References

1978 births
Living people
Footballers from Cali
Colombian footballers
Association football forwards
Deportivo Pasto footballers
Deportivo Cali footballers
Cortuluá footballers
Centauros Villavicencio footballers
Atlético Huila footballers
Millonarios F.C. players